Chenaq Bolagh or Chanaq Bolagh may refer to:
 Chenaq Bolagh, Ardabil
 Chanaq Bolagh, East Azerbaijan
 Chenaq Bolagh, Zanjan